State Route 359 (SR 359) is a state highway in Mineral County, Nevada, in the United States.  It starts from where California State Route 167 ends at the California stateline and continues the road on north to U.S. Route 95 in Hawthorne. Prior to the 1976 mass renumbering of Nevada State Routes SR 359 was numbered Nevada State Route 31.

History
For most editions, The official Nevada Highway Map shows SR 31 as equivalent to modern SR 359. However, starting with the 1962 edition and ending with the renumbering, a highway equivalent to modern SR 839 is shown as a disconnected segment of SR 31 with an undesignated dirt road connecting the two segments.

Major intersections

References

359
Transportation in Mineral County, Nevada